WDR 4 is a German public radio station owned and operated by the Westdeutscher Rundfunk (WDR).

References

Westdeutscher Rundfunk
Radio stations in Germany
Radio stations established in 1984
1984 establishments in West Germany
Mass media in Cologne